The Intelligence Advanced Research Projects Activity (IARPA) is an organization within the Office of the Director of National Intelligence responsible for leading research to overcome difficult challenges relevant to the United States Intelligence Community.  IARPA characterizes its mission as follows: "To envision and lead high-risk, high-payoff research that delivers innovative technology for future overwhelming intelligence advantage."

IARPA funds academic and industry research across a broad range of technical areas, including mathematics, computer science, physics, chemistry, biology, neuroscience, linguistics, political science, and cognitive psychology. Most IARPA research is unclassified and openly published. IARPA transfers successful research results and technologies to other government agencies. Notable IARPA investments include quantum computing, superconducting computing, machine learning, and forecasting tournaments.

Mission 
IARPA characterizes its mission as follows:

To envision and lead high-risk, high-payoff research that delivers innovative technology for future overwhelming intelligence advantage.

History 
In 1958, the first Advanced Research Projects Agency, or ARPA, was created in response to an unanticipated surprise—the Soviet Union's successful launch of Sputnik on October 4, 1957. The ARPA model was designed to anticipate and pre-empt technological surprise. As then-Secretary of Defense Neil McElroy said, "I want an agency that makes sure no important thing remains undone because it doesn’t fit somebody's mission." The ARPA model has been characterized by ambitious technical goals, competitively awarded research led by term-limited staff, and independent testing and evaluation.

Authorized by the ODNI in 2006, IARPA was modeled after DARPA but focused on national intelligence needs, rather than military needs.  The agency was a consolidation of the National Security Agency's Disruptive Technology Office, the National Geospatial-Intelligence Agency's National Technology Alliance, and the Central Intelligence Agency's Intelligence Technology Innovation Center. IARPA operations began on October 1, 2007 with Lisa Porter as founding Director. Its headquarters, a new building in M Square, the University of Maryland's research park in Riverdale Park, Maryland, was dedicated in April 2009.

IARPA's quantum computing research was named Science magazine's Breakthrough of the Year in 2010. In 2015, IARPA was named to lead foundational research and development in the National Strategic Computing Initiative. IARPA is also a part of other White House science and technology efforts, including the U.S. BRAIN Initiative, and the Nanotechnology-Inspired Grand Challenge for Future Computing. In 2013, New York Times op-ed columnist David Brooks called IARPA "one of the government's most creative agencies."

Approach 
IARPA invests in multi-year research programs, in which academic and industry teams compete to solve a well-defined set of technical problems, regularly scored on a shared set of metrics and milestones. Each program is led by an IARPA Program Manager (PM) who is a term-limited Government employee. IARPA programs are meant to enable researchers to pursue ideas that are potentially disruptive to the status quo.

Most IARPA research is unclassified and openly published.  Former director Jason Matheny has stated the agency's goals of openness and external engagement to draw in expertise from academia and industry, or even individuals who "might be working in their basement on some data-science project and might have an idea for how to solve an important problem". IARPA transfers successful research results and technologies to other government agencies.

Research fields 
IARPA is known for its programs to fund research into anticipatory intelligence, using data science to make predictions about future events ranging from political elections to disease outbreaks to cyberattacks, some of which focus on open-source intelligence.  IARPA has pursued these objectives not only through traditional funding programs but also through tournaments and prizes.  c is an example of one such program.  Other projects involve analysis of images or video that lacks metadata by directly analyzing the media's content itself.  Examples given by IARPA include determining the location of an image by analyzing features such as placement of trees or a mountain skyline, or determining whether a video is of a baseball game or a traffic jam.  Another program focuses on developing speech recognition tools that can transcribe arbitrary languages.

IARPA is also involved in high-performance computing and alternative computing methods.  In 2015, IARPA was named as one of two foundational research and development agencies in the National Strategic Computing Initiative, with the specific charge of "future computing paradigms offering an alternative to standard semiconductor computing technologies".  One such approach is cryogenic superconducting computing, which seeks to use superconductors such as niobium rather than semiconductors to reduce the energy consumption of future exascale supercomputers.

Several programs at IARPA focus on quantum computing and neuroscience.  IARPA is a major funder of quantum computing research due to its applications in quantum cryptography.  As of 2009, IARPA was said to provide a large portion of quantum computing funding resources in the United States.  Quantum computing research funded by IARPA was named Science Magazine's Breakthrough of the Year in 2010, and physicist David Wineland was a winner of the 2012 Nobel Prize in Physics for quantum computing research funded by IARPA. IARPA is also involved in neuromorphic computation efforts as part of the U.S. BRAIN Initiative and the National Nanotechnology Initiative's Grand Challenge for Future Computing.  IARPA's MICrONS project seeks to reverse engineer one cubic millimeter of brain tissue and use insights from its study to improve machine learning and artificial intelligence.

Research programs 
Below are some of the past and current research programs of IARPA.

Past research 
 Aggregative Contingent Estimation (ACE) Program aimed "to dramatically enhance the accuracy, precision, and timeliness of intelligence forecasts for a broad range of event types, through the development of advanced techniques that elicit, weight, and combine the judgments of many intelligence analysts."
 ATHENA Program was a research program about cybersecurity. It aimed "to provide an early warning system for detecting precursors to cyberattacks".
 Babel Program developed "agile and robust speech recognition technology that can be rapidly applied to any human language in order to provide effective search capability for analysts to efficiently process massive amounts of real-world recorded speech". The program tries to develop a software that can transcribe and search among all the languages.
 Biometrics Exploitation Science & Technology (BEST) Program focused on "significantly advance the state-of-the-science for biometrics technologies". It was to discover techniques on utilising biometric from a subject in a less controlled environment which could produce a similar result to that in a controlled environment.
 Synthetic Holographic Observation (SHO) Program's stated goal was "to enable full-parallax, full-color, high-resolution display of dynamic 3D data without head-gear, and possessing visually continuous perspectives without artifacts over wide viewing angles."

Current research 
 Creation of Operationally Realistic 3-D Environments (CORE3D) aims to "develop rapid automated systems for 3-D models which are designed with complex physical properties and automated methods that will pull commercial, satellite, and airborne imagery."
 Crowdsourcing Evidence, Argumentation, Thinking and Evaluation (CREATE) Program is about "to develop, and experimentally test, systems that use crowdsourcing and structured analytic techniques to improve analytic reasoning". It hopes to improve the intelligence community's ability on better understanding evidence and sources in order to produce accurate information.
 Deep Intermodal Video Analytics (DIVA) aims to "advance state-of-the-art artificial visual perception, and automate video monitoring."
 Functional Genomic and Computational Assessment of Threats (Fun GCAT) aims to "develop next-generation biological data tools to improve DNA sequence screening, augment biodefense capabilities through the characterization of threats, and advance our understanding of the relative risks posed by unknown sequences."
 Hybrid Forecasting Competition (HFC) aims to "improve accuracy in predicting worldwide geopolitical issues, including foreign political elections, interstate conflict, disease outbreaks, and economic indicators by leveraging the relative strengths of humans and machines."
 Machine Translation for English Retrieval of Information in Any Language (MATERIAL) aims to "develop and deploy fully automatic systems that will allow English-only speakers to accurately and efficiently identify foreign language documents of interest."
 Molecular Analyzer for Efficient Gas-phase Low-power Interrogation (MAEGLIN) aims to "develop a compact system capable of unattended environmental sampling and chemical identification with minimal (preferably no) consumables."
 Multimodal Objective Sensing to Assess Individuals with Context (MOSAIC) Program aims to develop "unobtrusive, passive, and persistent measurement to predict an individual’s job performance". It designs and tests sensors which can collect data about monitoring employees' work performance.
 Rapid Analysis of Various Emerging Nano-electronics (RAVEN) aims to "develop tools to rapidly image current and future integrated circuit chips."
 Space-based Machine Automated Recognition Technique (SMART) program

Directors
 Steven Nixon (acting, 2007)
 Tim Murphy (acting, 2007–2008)
 Lisa Porter (2008–2012)
 Peter Highnam (2012–2015)
 Jason Matheny (2015–2018)
Stacey Dixon (2018–2019)
Catherine Marsh (2019–present)

See also
 Defense Advanced Research Projects Agency (DARPA)
 Advanced Research Projects Agency–Energy (ARPA-E) 
 Homeland Security Advanced Research Projects Agency (HSARPA)

References

Further reading
 Signal. (2015). Data Analytics Programs Help Predict Global Unrest. Retrieved December 1, 2015.
 CS4ISR & Networks. (2015). IARPA's high-stakes intelligence experiment.  Retrieved September 23, 2015.
 Executive Gov (2015). Jason Matheny: IARPA Seeks Automated Methods to Identify Cyber Attack Indicators. Retrieved October 14, 2015.
 Federal Times (2015). How IARPA Predicts the Unpredictable. Retrieved November 2, 2015.
 Fedscoop. (2013). Intelligence agency wants to know what makes you tick .  Retrieved January 17, 2014.
 Harvard Business Review (2015). How a Video Game Helped People Make Better Decisions. Retrieved October 13, 2015.
 IEEE Spectrum (2015). IARPA’s New Director Wants You to Surprise Him. Retrieved October 19, 2015.
 New York Times. (2013). Forecasting Fox. Retrieved July 11, 2014.
 Popular Mechanics. (2015). What They're Building Inside America's Secret Spy Tech Lab. Retrieved September 23, 2015.
 USA Today. (2007). New IARPA Agency Developing Spy Tools. Retrieved October 2, 2015. 
 Washington Post. (2013). Good judgment in forecasting international affairs. Retrieved February 10, 2014.
 Wired. (2010). U.S. Spies Want Algorithms to Spot Hot Trends. Retrieved August 13, 2014.

External links
 

Agencies of the United States government
United States intelligence agencies
Quantum computing